The first G Fest took place on June 16–18, 2016, featuring 85 musicians on four stages over three days, the majority of which were Oklahomans. The lineup included headliners Old Crow Medicine Show, The Avett Brothers and Kacey Musgraves.

Merle Haggard was originally slated to headline the final night of G Fest, but he died two months before the festival took place. The festival was dedicated in his memory. The opening of the third day included a proclamation by Oklahoma Governor, Mary Fallin, officially making it "Merle Haggard Day," the unveiling of a "Merle Haggard Ave" street sign that will be placed in front of the Muskogee Civic Center where he recorded his live album, and a video of a planned "Merle Haggard Plaza" that will include a life size statue of Haggard. Artist Richard Hight concluded the ceremony by painting a portrait of Haggard live on stage while "Okie from Muskogee" was playing in the background.

References 

Music festivals in Oklahoma
Rock festivals in the United States
Folk festivals in the United States
Music festivals established in 2016